Coleophora arenicola is a moth of the family Coleophoridae that is endemic to Algeria.

The larvae feed on Hedysarum multijugum. They feed on the generative organs of their host plant.

References

External links

arenicola
Moths of Africa
Endemic fauna of Algeria
Moths described in 1952